The New York Press Photographers Association is an association of photojournalists who
work for news organizations in the print and electronic media based within a seventy-five mile radius of Manhattan. The organization was founded in 1913 and has over 250 active members.

It sponsors an annual awards contest and publishes the New York Press Photographer, an annual book displaying winning work from the contest.

Officers and trustees

Officers (2021–2023) 
 Bruce Cotler (President) – Photojournalist-independent 
 Debra L. Rothenberg (Vice President) – Photojournalist-independent 
 Marc A. Hermann (Secretary) – Photojournalist-independent 
 William Perlman (Treasurer) – Newsday

Board of trustees (2021–2023) 
 Jennifer Altman – Photojournalist-independent 
 Porter Binks – Photojournalist-independent 
 Dennis Clark – Photojournalist-independent 
 Kevin Downs – Photojournalist-independent 
 Mark Dye – Photojournalist-independent 
 Thomas A. Ferrara – Newsday
 Gary Hershorn – Photojournalist-independent 
 Richard Lee – Photojournalist-independent 
 Todd Maisel – Photojournalist-independent 
 Curtis Means – Photojournalist-independent

Officers (2019–2021) 
 Bruce Cotler (President) – Photojournalist-independent 
 Todd Maisel (Vice President) – Photojournalist-independent 
 Marc A. Hermann (Secretary) – Photojournalist-independent 
 William Perlman (Treasurer) – Newsday

Board of trustees (2019–2021) 
 Jennifer Altman – Photojournalist-independent 
 Porter Binks – Photojournalist-independent 
 Kevin Downs – Photojournalist-independent 
 Mark Dye – Photojournalist-independent 
 Thomas A. Ferrara – Newsday
 David Handschuh – Photojournalist-independent 
 Gary Hershorn – Photojournalist-independent 
 Richard Lee – Photojournalist-independent 
 Curtis Means – Photojournalist-independent 
 Debra L. Rothenberg – Photojournalist-independent

Officers (2017–2019) 
 Bruce Cotler (President) – Photojournalist-independent 
 Todd Maisel (Vice President) – Photojournalist-independent 
 Marc A. Hermann (Secretary) – Photojournalist-independent 
 William Perlman (Treasurer) – Newsday

Board of trustees (2017–2019) 
 Jennifer Altman – Photojournalist-independent 
 Porter Binks – Photojournalist-independent 
 Mark Dye – Photojournalist-independent 
 Thomas A. Ferrara – Newsday
 David Handschuh – Photojournalist-independent 
 Gary Hershorn – Photojournalist-independent 
 Richard Lee – Photojournalist-independent 
 Debra Rothenberg – Photojournalist-independent 
 Robert Sabo – Photojournalist-independent 
 Dennis Van Tine – Photojournalist-independent

Past presidents 
 David Pokress – Photojournalist-independent 2011-2015
 Ray Stubblebine – Photojournalist-independent 2005-2011
 Bernie Nunez – Photojournalist-independent 2003-2005
 Joe DeMaria – New York Post 1999-2003
 Susan Watts – New York Daily News 1997-1999
 Bill Turnbull – New York Daily News1995-1997

Emeritus board of trustees 
 Joseph DeMaria – V&P News Service
 Bill Turnbull – New York Daily News (Retired)
 Richard Drew – Associated Press
 Ray Stubblebine – Independent – Reuters

NYPPA Photographers of the Year (1996–present) 
1996: John Keating – Newsday
1997: Susan Watts – New York Daily News
1998: Todd Maisel – New York Daily News
1999: Gerald Herbert – New York Daily News
2000: Evy Mages – New York Daily News
2001: Vincent LaForet – The New York Times
2002: Aristide Economopoulos – The Star-Ledger
2003: Aristide Economopoulos – The Star-Ledger
2004: Michael Appleton – New York Daily News
2005: Ron Antonelli – New York Daily News
2006: Mario Tama – Getty Images
2007: Moises Saman – Newsday
2008: Aristide Economopoulos – The Star-Ledger
2009: Jennifer Brown – The Star-Ledger
2010: David Goldman – Associated Press
2011: Aristide Economopoulos – The Star-Ledger
2012: Aristide Economopoulos – The Star-Ledger
2013: David Goldman – Associated Press
2014: Kirsten Luce – Independent
2015: James Keivom – New York Daily News
2016: Aristide Economopoulos – NJ Advance Media
2017: David Goldman – Associated Press
2018: Aristide Economopoulos – NJ Advance Media
2019: Thomas A. Ferrara – Newsday
2020: Aristide Economopoulos – NJ Advance Media
2021: David Goldman – Associated Press
2022: Adam Gray – SWNS
2023:

NYPPA Anthony J. Causi Sports Photographer of the Year (2015–present)

2015: Al Bello – Getty Images – Sports Photographer of the Year
2016: Al Bello – Getty Images – Sports Photographer of the Year
2017: Al Bello – Getty Images – Sports Photographer of the Year
2019: Brad Penner – Independent for USA Today Sports – Sports Photographer of the Year
2020: Brad Penner – Independent for USA Today Sports – Sports Photographer of the Year
2021: Michael Stobe – Independent for Getty Images – Sports Photographer of the Year
2022: Robert Sabo – Independent for New York Post
2023:

NYPPA Best in Show (1972–present)
1972: (B/W) – Ed Adams – Time Magazine
1972: 
1973: 
1974: 
1975: 
1976: 
1977: 
1978:
1979
1980: 
1981: 
1982: 
1983: 
1984: 
1985: 
1986:
1987:
1988:   
1989: (B/W)
1989: (Color)
1990: (B/W) – Susan Farley – New York Newsday – "Vietnam Vet Dad Remembers"
1990: (Color)
1991: (B/W)
1991: (Color)
1992: (B/W)
1992: (Color)
1993: (B/W) – John Keating – Newsday – "Special Prom"
1993: (Color) – Steven Schmidt – Gannett Westchester – "The Nominee"
1994: (B/W)
1994: (Color)
1995: (B/W) – Gerald Herbert – New York Daily News – "Haiti – The Revolution Within"
1995: (Color) – Ron Frehm – Associated Press 
1996: Jon Naso – New York Newsday – "Mourning the Rebbe"
1997: Susan Watts – Daily News – "Miriam"
1998: Audrey Tiernan – Newsday – "A Room With a View"
1999: Jim Estrin – The New York Times – "Gene Therapy- Keeping Jacob Alive"
2000: Steve Klaver – The Star- Ledger – "Double Murder Suicide"
2001: Bob Deutsch – USA Today – "What were they Thinking?"
2002: Jeff Christensen – Reuters – "People Looking out Windows of the WTC"
2003: Aristide Economopoulos – The Star-Ledger – "Daddys Girl"
2004: Spencer Platt – Getty Images – ""The Invasion Begins"
2005: Michael Appleton – New York Daily News – "Street Fight"
2006: Craig Warga – New York Daily News – "New Orleans Burning"
2007: Moises Saman – Newsday – "Presidential Elections in Haiti"
2008: Todd Maisel – New York Daily News – "First Blood"
2009: David Goldman – Independent – "Harlem reacts to Obamas Win"
2010: Hiroko Masuike – Independent – "Bernard Madoff"
2011: Aristide Economopoulos – The Star-Ledger – "Fight Break Up"
2012: Craig Ruttle – Independent – "Hail to the Chief"
2013: James Keivom – New York Daily News – "Hurricane Sandy"
2014: Al Bello – Getty Images – "Synchronized diving"
2015: James Keivom – New York Daily News – "Eric Garner Protests"
2016: David Goldman – Associated Press – "Baltimore Police Death Protest"
2017: Thomas A. Ferrara – Newsday – ''Doubly Devoted the Tardiff Twins'"
2018: Byron Smith – Independent – "We Can't Be Sure"
2019: Byron Smith – Independent – "Remembering Saheed"
2020: Craig Ruttle – Independent – 'Momentary Marathon'
2021: Al Bello – Getty Images – 'Pandemic Hug'
2022: Patrick T. Benic – UPI -"Man Tries to breakthrough Main Door of House Chambers"
2023:

Louis Liotta Lifetime Achievement Award 
The Louis Liotta Lifetime Achievement Award is awarded for lifetime photography accomplishments.
1989: Herb Schwartz – CBS Network News Director of Photography
2001: Larry DeSantis – United Press International 
2002: Martin Lederhandler – The Associated Press
2011: Charles Ruppmann – New York Daily News
2013: Jerry Engel – New York Post
2017: Ray Stubblebine – Reuters
2017: Richard Drew – The Associated Press
2018: William Turnbull – New York Daily News
2019: Susan Watts – New York Daily News
2021: Marilynn K. Yee – New York Times
2021: Kathy Willens – Associated Press
2022: Todd Maisel – New York Daily News

New York Press Photographers Award of Merit  
1993: David Dinkins – New York City Mayor
2010: Katherine Conits - Starwood Hotels – Director, Community Outreach
2014: Eric L. Adams – Brooklyn Borough President
2015: Chief Joseph Fox – New York City Police Department
2015: Chief James Leonard – New York City Fire Department
2015: Hon. Ydanis Rodriguez – New York City Councilman
2021: Elizabeth G. Pratt – Canon USA. Inc. - Director, Professional Client Development & Support
2023:

Good Guy and Good Gal Awards 
The New York Press Photographers Association "Good Guy, Good Gal" Award Winners since 1952 when the award was originated.

References

External links 
 
 Vimeo.com/nyppa

Newspaper associations
American photography organizations
1913 establishments in New York (state)
Photojournalism organizations
Organizations established in 1913